Edwall may refer to:

Edwall (surname)
Edwall, Washington